Three Golden Rivers is an historical, young-adult novel by the American writer Olive Price.

Set in 1850, it tells the story of four orphaned siblings who must leave the family farm after their father is killed and head to Pittsburgh, Pennsylvania to find work. The children land in a multi-ethnic neighborhood where Stephen befriends a Scottish lad named Andrew Carnegie.

Sources
Contemporary Authors Online. The Gale Group, 2002. PEN (Permanent Entry Number):  0000079845.

1948 American novels
Novels set in Pittsburgh
Novels about orphans
Fiction set in 1850